Skalka nad Váhom  is a village and municipality in Trenčín District in the Trenčín Region of north-western Slovakia.

History
In historical records the village was first mentioned in 1208.

Geography
The municipality lies at an altitude of 233 metres and covers an area of 8.680 km². It has a population of about 1077 people.

External links
 
 
http://www.statistics.sk/mosmis/eng/run.html

Villages and municipalities in Trenčín District